Ibrahim Šehić (born 2 September 1988) is a Bosnian professional footballer who plays as a goalkeeper for Süper Lig club Konyaspor and the Bosnia and Herzegovina national team.

Šehić started his professional career at Željezničar, before joining Mersin Talim Yurdu in 2011. Two years later, he moved to Qarabağ. In 2018, Šehić signed with Erzurumspor. He switched to Konyaspor in 2020.

A former youth international for Bosnia and Herzegovina, Šehić made his senior international debut in 2010, earning over 40 caps since.

Club career

Early career
Šehić came through Željezničar's youth academy. He made his professional debut against Orašje on 26 May 2007 at the age of 18. Being given the armband at the age of 20, he is the youngest captain in club's history.

In June 2011, he joined Turkish side Mersin Talim Yurdu.

Qarabağ
In October 2013, Šehić was transferred to Azerbaijani outfit Qarabağ for an undisclosed fee. On 24 November, he made his official debut for the team in a goalless draw against Ravan Baku. He won his first trophy with the club on 7 May 2014, when they were crowned league champions.

In December, he signed a new four-year deal with the side.

He played his 100th game for the team against Gabala on 19 December 2015.

Šehić helped Qarabağ make their first historical UEFA Champions League appearance in 2017–18 season. On 12 September 2017, he debuted in the competition away at Chelsea and stood out during group stage, as he was the goalkeeper with most saves, having made 35 in 6 games.

Erzurumspor
In July 2018, Šehić moved to Erzurumspor on a three-year contract. He made his competitive debut for the side against Rizespor on 24 August and kept a clean sheet.

Despite Erzurumspor's relegation to 1. Lig in May 2019, Šehić decided to stay at the club and became its captain.

Konyaspor
In August 2020, Šehić switched to Konyaspor on a two-year deal. On 19 September, he debuted officially for the team against Gençlerbirliği and managed to save his net.

He was named club captain in November.

In November 2021, he extended his contract until June 2023.

International career
Šehić was a member of Bosnia and Herzegovina under-21 team for several years.

In May 2010, he received his first senior call-up, for friendly games against Sweden and Germany, but had to wait until 17 November to make his debut against Slovakia.

Personal life
Šehić married his long-time girlfriend Merjem in January 2020. Together they have a daughter named Esma.

He is a practising Muslim; along with international teammates Muhamed Bešić, Armin Hodžić, Izet Hajrović, Sead Kolašinac, Edin Višća and Ervin Zukanović he visited a mosque in Zenica during national team concentration.

Career statistics

Club

International

Honours
Željezničar
Bosnian Premier League: 2009–10
Bosnian Cup: 2010–11

Qarabağ
Azerbaijan Premier League: 2013–14, 2014–15, 2015–16, 2016–17, 2017–18
Azerbaijan Cup: 2014–15, 2015–16, 2016–17

References

External links

Living people
1988 births
People from Rogatica
Bosniaks of Bosnia and Herzegovina
Bosnia and Herzegovina Muslims
Bosnia and Herzegovina footballers
Bosnia and Herzegovina under-21 international footballers
Bosnia and Herzegovina international footballers
Bosnia and Herzegovina expatriate footballers
Association football goalkeepers
FK Željezničar Sarajevo players
Mersin İdman Yurdu footballers
Qarabağ FK players
Büyükşehir Belediye Erzurumspor footballers
Konyaspor footballers
Premier League of Bosnia and Herzegovina players
Süper Lig players
Azerbaijan Premier League players
TFF First League players
Expatriate footballers in Turkey
Expatriate footballers in Azerbaijan
Bosnia and Herzegovina expatriate sportspeople in Turkey
Bosnia and Herzegovina expatriate sportspeople in Azerbaijan